Johnathan Garth Nathans (born June 10, 1979) is a retired professional baseball catcher and outfielder. He last played in 2007 in the Atlantic League of Professional Baseball with the Bridgeport Bluefish.

A native of Warwick, New York, Nathans attended Trinity-Pawling School and the University of Richmond. In 2000, he played collegiate summer baseball with the Cotuit Kettleers of the Cape Cod Baseball League.

In a 2007 game, Bluefish pitcher Matt Beech hit opposing batter José Offerman with a pitch; Offerman then charged the mound with the bat. Nathans ran to the mound and attempted to stop Offerman from attacking Beech, but was struck in the head and sustained a concussion. Beech's finger was also broken during this incident. 

The concussion ended Nathans' playing career. Nathans later won a lawsuit against Offerman for ending his career.

References

External links

1979 births
Cotuit Kettleers players
Bridgeport Bluefish players
Lowell Spinners players
Augusta GreenJackets players
Portland Sea Dogs players
Nashua Pride players
Lancaster Barnstormers players
North Shore Spirit players
Newark Bears players
Living people
Baseball players from New York (state)
People from Warwick, New York
Baseball catchers